Rear Admiral Michael John Slattery,  (born 1954) is a Royal Australian Naval Reserve officer and lawyer. He has been a justice of the Supreme Court of New South Wales since 2009 and the Judge Advocate General of the Australian Defence Force since July 2014.

Legal career
Slattery graduated from the University of Sydney with degrees in arts (1975) and law (1977). He became a barrister in 1978, Queen's Counsel in 1992 and justice of the Supreme Court of New South Wales in 2009. He joined the Royal Australian Navy Reserve as a Lieutenant in Supply Branch – Legal in 1990. He rose through the ranks and was appointed Judge Advocate General – Navy (as commodore) in 2010 and Judge Advocate General – ADF (as rear admiral) in 2014.

Slattery has been appointed a Member of the Order of Australia (AM) twice: he was appointed in the Military Division in the 2019 Queen's Birthday Honours for "exceptional service to military law". In the 2022 Australia Day Honours, Slattery was again appointed a Member, this time in the General Division, for "significant service to the law, to the judiciary, and to professional legal associations".

References

1954 births
Australian military personnel of the Iraq War
Living people
Members of the Order of Australia
Royal Australian Navy admirals
Sydney Law School alumni
Judges of the Supreme Court of New South Wales
21st-century Australian judges
Australian King's Counsel